The 1985 PSA Men's World Open Squash Championship is the men's edition of the 1985 World Open, which serves as the individual world championship for squash players. The event took place in Cairo in Egypt from 18 November to 25 November 1985. Jahangir Khan won his fifth consecutive World Open title, defeating Ross Norman in the final.

Seeds

Draw and results

Notes
The 1985 championships saw controversy when many courts had not been prepared properly and this caused players to slip. This nearly led to Jahangir Khan withdrawing during his first round match.

See also
PSA World Open
1985 Women's World Open Squash Championship

References

External links
World Squash History

World Squash Championships
1985 in squash
1985 in Egyptian sport
1980s in Cairo
November 1985 sports events in Africa
Squash tournaments in Egypt
Sports competitions in Cairo
International sports competitions hosted by Egypt